Douglas Fordyce (born 3 February 1990), known usually as Doug Fordyce, is a British acrobatic gymnast who won the title of world men's pairs champion with Edward Upcott in July 2010 in Poland.

Until 2012, Fordyce was a member of Spelbound, the gymnastic group who rose to fame in 2010, winning the fourth series of Britain's Got Talent. The prize was £100,000 and the opportunity to appear at the 2010 Royal Variety Performance. Having retired from Spelbound, Fordyce and Upcott are pursuing a stage act route together called Brothers of Eden.

In 2014, Fordyce took part in the BBC Series Tumble as an acrobatic professional and was paired with Amelle Barrabah. In 2021 he appeared in the BBC soap opera EastEnders playing a character who is beaten up for being homophobic and ableist.

References

External links
 

1990 births
Living people
British acrobatic gymnasts
Male acrobatic gymnasts
Sportspeople from Devon
Britain's Got Talent contestants
Medalists at the Acrobatic Gymnastics World Championships
Competitors at the 2009 World Games
World Games bronze medalists
21st-century British people